Johanna Sibelius (10 February 1913 – 8 March 1970) was a German screenwriter.

Her sisters were the actress Jutta Freybe and the writer Martha Albrand.

Selected filmography
 Congo Express (dir. Eduard von Borsody, 1939) — based on her own novel
 Der dunkle Punkt (dir. Georg Zoch, 1940)
 Wenn du noch eine Heimat hast (dir. Günther Rittau, 1942) — based on the play Der Strom by Max Halbe
 Meine Freundin Josefine (dir. Hans H. Zerlett, 1942)
 Nacht ohne Abschied (dir. Erich Waschneck, 1943)
 Am Abend nach der Oper (dir. Arthur Maria Rabenalt, 1945) — based on the novella Der Fund by 
 Five Suspects (dir. Kurt Hoffmann, 1950) — based on the novel Thomsen verhört die Prima by Herbert Moll
 Die Sehnsucht des Herzens (dir. Paul Martin, 1951) — based on the novel D-Zug 517 by Maria von Peteani
 Captive Soul (dir. Hans Wolff, 1952)
 Klettermaxe (dir. Kurt Hoffmann, 1952) — based on the eponymous novel by Hans Mahner-Mons
 Until We Meet Again (dir. Gustav Ucicky, 1952)
 Dreaming Lips (dir. Josef von Báky, 1953) — remake of the 1932 film Dreaming Lips, based on the play Mélo by Henri Bernstein
 Music by Night (dir. Kurt Hoffmann, 1953)
 Mailman Mueller (dir. John Reinhardt, 1953)
 When the White Lilacs Bloom Again (dir. Hans Deppe, 1953)
 Men at a Dangerous Age (dir. Carl-Heinz Schroth, 1954)
 The Seven Dresses of Katrin (dir. Hans Deppe, 1954) — based on the eponymous novel by Gisi Gruber
 Love is Forever (dir. Wolfgang Liebeneiner, 1954) — based on the play Fires of St. John by Hermann Sudermann
 Sacred Lie (dir. Wolfgang Liebeneiner, 1955)
 I Was an Ugly Girl (dir. Wolfgang Liebeneiner, 1955) — based on the eponymous novel by Annemarie Selinko
 My Leopold (dir. Géza von Bolváry, 1955) — based on the play My Leopold by Adolphe L'Arronge
 My Husband's Getting Married Today (dir. Kurt Hoffmann, 1956) — based on the eponymous novel by Annemarie Selinko
  (dir. Günther Lüders, 1957) — based on the eponymous novel by 
 Scandal in Bad Ischl (dir. Rolf Thiele, 1957) — based on the play The Master by Hermann Bahr
 Meine schöne Mama (dir. Paul Martin, 1958) — based on the eponymous novel by Mathilde Walewska
 Arms and the Man (dir. Franz Peter Wirth, 1958) — based on the play Arms and the Man by George Bernard Shaw
  (dir. Helmut Weiss, 1959) — based on the play Rendezvous in Wien by Fritz Eckhardt
 Jacqueline (dir. Wolfgang Liebeneiner, 1959)
 Mrs. Warren's Profession (dir. Ákos Ráthonyi, 1960) — based on the play Mrs. Warren's Profession by George Bernard Shaw
 Der Traum des Mr. Borton (dir. Anton Schelkopf, 1960, TV film)
 Stefanie in Rio (dir. Curtis Bernhardt, 1960) — sequel to the film Stefanie, based on the novel Stefanie oder Die liebenswerten Torheiten by 
  (dir. Georg Tressler, 1961) — based on the eponymous novel by Robert Pilchowski
  (dir. , 1961)
 The Last of Mrs. Cheyney (dir. , 1961) — based on the play The Last of Mrs. Cheyney by Frederick Lonsdale
 Adorable Julia (dir. Alfred Weidenmann, 1962) — based on the novel Theatre by W. Somerset Maugham
 Only a Woman (dir. Alfred Weidenmann, 1962)
 Waiting Room to the Beyond (1964) — based on the novel Mission To Siena by James Hadley Chase
 Condemned to Sin (dir. Alfred Weidenmann, 1964) — based on the novel The Fortress by Henry Jaeger
 Among Vultures (dir. Alfred Vohrer, 1964) — based on the eponymous book by Karl May
 Old Surehand (dir. Alfred Vohrer, 1965) — based on the eponymous novel by Karl May
 Hocuspocus (dir. Kurt Hoffmann, 1966) — based on the eponymous play by Curt Goetz
 Long Legs, Long Fingers (dir. Alfred Vohrer, 1966)
 Liselotte of the Palatinate (dir. Kurt Hoffmann, 1966)
 The Heathens of Kummerow (dir. Werner Jacobs, 1967) — based on the eponymous novel by Ehm Welk
 24 Hours in the Life of a Woman (dir. , 1968) — based on the novella Twenty-Four Hours in the Life of a Woman by Stefan Zweig
 Morning's at Seven (dir. Kurt Hoffmann, 1968) — based on the eponymous novel by Eric Malpass
 Heintje: A Heart Goes on a Journey (dir. Werner Jacobs, 1969)
 When Sweet Moonlight Is Sleeping in the Hills (dir. Wolfgang Liebeneiner, 1969) — based on the eponymous novel by Eric Malpass

References

Bibliography
 Bergfelder, Tim. International Adventures: German Popular Cinema and European Co-Productions in the 1960s. Berhahn Books,

External links

1913 births
1970 deaths
German women screenwriters
Film people from Berlin
20th-century German screenwriters